The Inner City of Johannesburg, Gauteng Province, South Africa has a number districts including Braamfontein, Braampark, Central Business District, Doornfontein, Hillbrow, Jeppestown, Joubert Park, Marshalltown, Newtown, Berea and Yeoville, among others.

Suburbs of Johannesburg